Paphiopedilum exul is a species of orchid endemic to peninsular Thailand. This orchid is found growing in humus-filled crevices, and is not difficult to grow or flower. Its greenish yellow flowers appear from February to May.

References

External links 

exul
Orchids of Thailand